My People Are Not Yours (Swedish: Mitt folk är icke ditt) is a 1944 Swedish drama film directed by Weyler Hildebrand and starring Sonja Wigert, Gunnar Björnstrand and Hampe Faustman. It was shot at the Centrumateljéerna Studios in Stockholm. The film's sets were designed by the art director P.A. Lundgren. It was one of several Swedish films made during the period set in occupied countries similar to German-controlled Denmark and Norway.

Synopsis
Elsie, a pianist returns home after a world tour. At the home of her shipowner father an air raid disturbs them and is followed by an invasion by a foreign country. One of the officers of the occupying army turns out to be Major Rolf von Ritter, with whom she had a romance before the conflict.

Cast
 Sonja Wigert as Else Hill
 Gunnar Björnstrand as 	Major Rolf von Ritter
 Hampe Faustman as 	Max Holm
 Håkan Westergren as 	Skådespelare Georg Lycke
 Björn Berglund as 	Doktor Herbert Ran
 Mona Mårtenson as 	Mary Ran
 Sven Bergvall as 	Skeppsredare John Hill
 Anna-Lisa Baude as 	Tant Sara
 Douglas Håge as 	Polismästare Wulff
 Nils Hallberg as Ernst Holm
 Olle Hilding as 	Caretaker
 Åke Engfeldt as 	Ernst's Friend
 Nils Nordståhl as Henri
 Fylgia Zadig as 	Anna - Maid
 Aurore Palmgren as 	Maria - Maid
 Sven d'Ailly as 	Captain Miller
 Linnéa Hillberg as 	Lady at Restaurant
 Erland Colliander as 	Old Jew
 Claes Thelander as 	Occupant
 Olav Riégo as 	Doctor
 Artur Cederborgh as 	Volunteer 
 Anders Frithiof as 	Volunteer 
 Sigge Fürst as 	Party Leader 
 Solveig Lagström as Nurse 
 Gunnar Nielsen as 	Journalist 
 Gabriel Rosén as 	Sgt. Kurt 
 Ragnar Widestedt as 	Colonel 
 Birger Åsander as 	Prison Guard

References

Bibliography 
 Wright, Rochelle. The Visible Wall: Jews and Other Ethnic Outsiders in Swedish Film. SIU Press, 1998.

External links 
 

1944 films
Swedish drama films
1944 drama films
1940s Swedish-language films
Films directed by Weyler Hildebrand
Films based on Swedish novels
1940s Swedish films